Leucophoebe pictilis is a species of beetle in the family Cerambycidae. It was described by Lane in 1972. It is known from Colombia and Ecuador.

References

Hemilophini
Beetles described in 1972